The men's 100 metres at the 1954 European Athletics Championships was held in Bern, Switzerland, at Stadion Neufeld on 25 and 26 August 1954.

Medalists

Results

Final
26 August

Semi-finals
26 August

Semi-final 1

Semi-final 2

Semi-final 3

Heats
25 August

Heat 1

Heat 2

Heat 3

Heat 4

Heat 5

Heat 6

Heat 7

Heat 8

Participation
According to an unofficial count, 35 athletes from 20 countries participated in the event.

 (1)
 (2)
 (2)
 (1)
 (2)
 (1)
 (2)
 (2)
 (2)
 (2)
 (1)
 (2)
 (2)
 (2)
 (1)
 (2)
 (2)
 (2)
 (2)
 (2)

References

100 metres
100 metres at the European Athletics Championships